Carretera (Spanish "highway") may refer to:

La Carretera, album by Julio Iglesias 1995
"La Carretera" (song), 2016 song by American singer Prince Royce

See also
Carretera Central (disambiguation)
Carretera Austral, Chile
Carretera de Cádiz, one of the 11 districts of the city of Málaga, Spain